Prior to its uniform adoption of proportional representation in 1999, the United Kingdom used first-past-the-post for the European elections in England, Scotland and Wales. The European Parliament constituencies used under that system were smaller than the later regional constituencies and only had one Member of the European Parliament each.

The constituency of Midlands Central was one of them.

From 1979 to 1984, it consisted of the Westminster Parliament constituencies of Coventry North East, Coventry North West, Coventry South East, Coventry South West, Solihull, Stratford-on-Avon, and Warwick and Leamington. From 1984 until its abolition in 1994 it consisted of Coventry North East, Coventry North West, Coventry South East, Coventry South West, Meriden, Rugby and Kenilworth, Solihull, and Warwick and Leamington.

Members of the European Parliament

Results

References

External links
 David Boothroyd's United Kingdom Election Results

European Parliament constituencies in England (1979–1999)
Politics of Warwickshire
Politics of the West Midlands (county)
1979 establishments in England
1994 disestablishments in England
Constituencies established in 1979
Constituencies disestablished in 1994